The National & Gulf Center for Evidence Based Health Practice has been established with the initiative of Bandar Al Knawy, Chief Executive Officer of National Guard Health Affairs, and with the support of former chief executive, Abdullah bin Abdulaziz Al Rabiah in March 2004. The center is recognized by the Cooperation Council for the Arab States of the Gulf Ministers of Health as a reference to evidence-based medicine (EBM) in Saudi Arabia and the Cooperation Council for the Arab States of the Gulf (GCC). The center is an affiliated center to Evidence Based Clinical Practice Group in McMaster University, Canada. This group is led by Gordon Guyatt. It is also a collaborating centre to The Joanna Briggs Institute for Evidence Based Health care, in the University of Adelaide, Australia. The center works in contact, coordination and collaboration with the National EBM committee, GCC Ministers of Health Executive Office, Arabian Gulf University EBM Center, Bahrain, University of Sharjah EBM center, United Arab Emirates, and Sultan Qaboos University EBM Center, Oman.

Mission
Promoting the concept and practice of evidence-based medicine in Saudi Arabia and in the GCC countries.

Vision
To provide appropriate and high quality evidence-based research for healthcare professionals and decision makers throughout Saudi Arabia and the GCC countries. And playing a pivotal role in the production and dissemination of such evidence in all areas of health care.

Motto
Best Evidence for Best Practice

Working Groups
The centre works with a number of local health centers and universities groups in Saudi Arabia, in addition to abroad working relationships with a number of universities and specialized centers in the field of evidence-based medicine:

King Saud University
King Faisal Specialist Hospital and Research Centre
Armed Forces Hospital
Qassim University
Saudi Society of Physiotherapy
Saudi German Hospital
Working group on evidence-based medicine in Jeddah, Madinah and Taif, Al-Ahsa
EBM center at the Arabian Gulf University
EBM center at Sultan Qaboos University
University of Sharjah
GCC Ministers of Health Executive Office
EBM Regional Office of the World Health Organization for the Eastern Mediterranean - Cairo
Evidence Health Center in University of Alberta - Canada.
The Joanna Briggs Institute - Australia
McMaster University - Canada

During the year 2009 NGCEBHP implemented 50 courses and workshops in the field of evidence-based medicine, attended by over 3,000 participants.

See also
King Saud bin Abdulaziz University for Health Sciences
National Guard Health Affairs

2004 establishments in Saudi Arabia
Research projects
Medical and health organisations based in Saudi Arabia